O Dono do Mundo (English: The Owner of the World) is a Brazilian telenovela produced and broadcast by TV Globo from May 20, 1991 to January 3, 1992 in 197 episodes.

Cast

Awards 
APCA (1991)
 Best actress - Glória Pires
 Best supporting actor - Cláudio Corrêa e Castro

Troféu Imprensa (1991)
 Best telenovela
 Best actress - Fernanda Montenegro
 Best actor - Antônio Fagundes

References

External links 
 O Dono do Mundo at Memória Globo
 

1991 telenovelas
Brazilian telenovelas
TV Globo telenovelas
1991 Brazilian television series debuts
1992 Brazilian television series endings
Telenovelas by Gilberto Braga
Portuguese-language telenovelas
Television shows set in Rio de Janeiro (city)